Laforey is a surname. Notable people with the surname include:

Francis Laforey (1767–1835), British admiral
John Laforey (1729–1796), British naval officer
Laforey baronets

Other uses
HMS Laforey